Klagomuren (Swedish for The Wailing Wall) is the third studio album by Swedish musician Jonathan Johansson. The album was released on 28 October 2011 to critical acclaim, earning three Grammis nominations. Four singles were released from the album: Blommorna, Stockholm, Centrum and Ingenting stort. The album was his last release on the label Hybris, as he moved to Sony Music for the release of his fourth album Ett språk för dom dömda.

Track listing
All music written by Jonathan Johansson and Johan Eckeborn. All lyrics written by Jonathan Johansson.

Personnel
 Jonathan Johansson – music, lyrics, vocals, guitar
 Johan Eckeborn – organ, bass, synthesizer, drums, production, recording, music
 Tom Coyne – mastering
 Kalle Magnusson – design (typography)
 Rikkard Häggbom – design (photography)

Charts

References

Jonathan Johansson (musician) albums
2011 albums
Swedish-language albums